Galerita lecontei, the false bombardier beetle, is a species of ground beetle in the family Carabidae. It is found in the Caribbean Sea, Central America, North America, and the Caribbean.

Subspecies
These four subspecies belong to the species Galerita lecontei:
 Galerita lecontei bicoloripes (Reichardt, 1967)
 Galerita lecontei lecontei Dejean, 1831
 Galerita lecontei tenebricosa Klug, 1834
 Galerita lecontei veracrucis Ball & Nimmo, 1983

References

Further reading

 

Harpalinae
Articles created by Qbugbot
Beetles described in 1831